Yahia Boukhari (born 15 June 1953) is the Algerian Secretary General of the government. He was appointed as Secretary on 2 January 2020.

References 

1953 births
21st-century Algerian politicians
Algerian politicians
Living people